Agustín Canalda (born 18 April 1977, in Buenos Aires) is an Argentine rugby union footballer. He plays as a hooker.

Canalda first team was Club Newman, where he had his first caps for Argentina U-19. He had 6 caps for the "Pumas", from 1999 to 2001, without scoring. Canalda was selected for the 1999 Rugby World Cup finals, where he played once.

References

External links
Profile of Agustín Canalda
Agustín Canalda International Statistics

1977 births
Living people
Argentine rugby union players
Rugby union hookers
Argentina international rugby union players
Club Newman rugby union players
Rugby union players from Buenos Aires